Richard Witten (born July 12, 1988) is an American baseball coach and former catcher, who is the current head baseball coach of the FIU Panthers. He played college baseball at Coastal Carolina.

Playing career
Witten attended Danville High School in Danville, Kentucky and played college baseball at Coastal Carolina.

Coaching career
Witten began his coaching career as a volunteer assistant coach at Miami (FL). In 2015, Witten became an assistant coach at Winthrop. Following a 3-year stint as an assistant with the Eagles, he took an assistant position with the VCU Rams.

On June 23, 2022, Witten was named the head coach of the FIU Panthers.

Head coaching record

References

External links
 FIU Panthers bio

1988 births
Coastal Carolina Chanticleers baseball players
FIU Panthers baseball coaches
Miami Hurricanes baseball coaches
VCU Rams baseball coaches
Winthrop Eagles baseball coaches
Baseball players from Kentucky
Living people
People from Danville, Kentucky